Annenberg is a surname. Notable people with the surname include:

Leonore Annenberg (1918–2009), former U.S. Chief of Protocol and former head of the Annenberg Foundation, widow of Walter Annenberg
Moses Annenberg
Sandra Annenberg (born 1968), Brazilian television journalist
Wallis Annenberg (born 1939), American philanthropist
Walter Annenberg (1908–2002), former U.S. Ambassador to Great Britain, billionaire publishing magnate, and philanthropist

German-language surnames
Jewish surnames
Yiddish-language surnames